S. Janaki is an Indian singer who has sung over 10,000 songs in various Indian languages. The following is a list of Hindi songs recorded by her:

film songs

1950s

1958

1960s

1960

1961

1962

1963

1964

1967

1970s

1971

1973

1974

1975

1976

1977

1978

1980s

1980

1981

1982

1983

1984

1985

1986

1987

1988

1989

1990s

1990

1991

1992

1994

1995

1996

References

Janaki, S.